Antonela Ferenčić (born 23 April 1994) is a Croatian racing cyclist. The winner of the 2013 Croatian National Road Race Championships, Ferenčić competed in the women's road race at the UCI Road World Championships in 2013, and 2014.

References

External links

1994 births
Living people
Croatian female cyclists
People from Pazin